The following is a list of notable people who were born in Rivers State, lived in Rivers State, or for whom Rivers State is a significant part of their identity.

A

George Abbey (born 1978), soccer player
Magnus Ngei Abe (born 1965), politician
Echendu Adiele (1978–2011), soccer player
Ernest Afiesimama (born 1960), weatherman, environmental and climate scientist 
Emmanuel C. Aguma, Attorney General of Rivers State
Friday Ahunanya (born 1971), boxer
Joseph Ajienka (born 1955), Vice-Chancellor of the University of Port Harcourt
Henry Ajumogobia (born 1956), Attorney General, Commissioner of Justice
Claude Ake (1939–1996), political scientist
Godspower Ake (1940–2016), legislator
Wilson Asinobi Ake (born 1955), Nigerian Senator from Rivers State
Mercy Akide (born 1975), former soccer player
Diezani Alison-Madueke (born 1960), minister of Petroleum Resources
Mactabene Amachree (born 1978), basketball player
Otelemaba Amachree (born 1963), MHA 
Elechi Amadi (1934–2016), author
Okey Amadi, MHA
Chibuike Amaechi (born 1965), Governor of Rivers State
Judith Amaechi (born 1970), former First Lady of Rivers State
Thankgod Amaefule (born 1984), soccer player
Martins Amaewhule, lawmaker
Chika Amalaha (born 1997), weightlifter
Benibo Anabraba, MHA
Betty Apiafi (born 1962), economist, retired banker, school teacher
Pere Ariweriyai (born 1983), soccer player
Napoleon Ashley-Lassen (born 1934), Chief of the Defence Staff of the Ghana Armed Forces
Tamunosiki Atorudibo (born 1985), athlete
Izu Azuka (born 1989), soccer player
John Azuta-Mbata, politician
Zacchaeus Adangor, Attorney General of Rivers State

B

Ipalibo Banigo (born 1952), medical doctor and politician. First female Deputy Governor of Rivers State
Herbert Bankole-Bright (1883–1958), politician
Innocent Barikor, academic and politician
A. Igoni Barrett (born 1979), writer
John Bazia, politician
Bella Bell-Gam (born 1956), pentathlete
Ngeri Benebo (born 1955), medical doctor
Andre Blaze (born 1983), rapper, reality talent show host
Worgu Boms (born 1968), Commissioner of Justice
Ann-Kio Briggs (born 1952), activist
Nimi Briggs (born 1944), Vice-Chancellor of the University of Port Harcourt
Roseberry Briggs (1925–2013), Speaker of the Rivers State House of Assembly
Tonye Briggs-Oniyide, Rivers State Commissioner of Culture and Tourism

C

Sokari Douglas Camp (born 1958), artist
Michael O. Chinda, Member of the House of Assembly
Monalisa Chinda (born 1974), actress
Mercy Chinwo, singer, actress
Tonye Cole (born 1967), business man
Andrea Cossu (born 1984), soccer player
Noah Arthur William Cox-George (1915–2004), economist and academic

D

Adams Dabotorudima, Speaker of the Rivers State House of Assembly
Diminas Dagogo, film director
Reynolds Bekinbo Dagogo-Jack (born 1957), politician 
Sumner Dagogo-Jack (born 1930), civil servant
 Harold Dappa-Biriye (born 1920), politician
Agbani Darego (born 1982), first black woman from Africa to win Miss World
George Datoru (born 1978), soccer player
Tam David-West (1936–2019), academic and former federal minister
Sam Dede, actor and politician
Blessing Didia, medical doctor
Tonto Dikeh (born 1985), actress and singer
Duncan Dokiwari (born 1973), boxer
Hilda Dokubo, actress
Eddy Lord Dombraye (born 1979), soccer player
Alabo Dakorinama George-Kelly , politician and surveyor

E
Kaniye Ebeku (born 1961), Commissioner for Education, lawyer
Ngozi Ebere (born 1991), soccer player
Emmanuel Ebiede (born 1978), soccer player
Frank Eke (1931–2013), Deputy Governor of Rivers State
Obinna Ekezie (born 1975), basketball player
Boniface S. Emerengwa, lawyer
Tamara Eteimo (born 1987), actress and singer
Dino Eze (born 1984), soccer player
Victor Ezeji (born 1981), soccer player
Sandra Ezekwesili (born 1989), radio personality
Ezekiel Warigbani youth activist/politician
Chinedu Ezimora (born 1985), soccer player

F
George Feyii accountant, politician 
Ibinabo Fiberesima (born 1973), actress
Tam Fiofori (born 1942), writer, photographer
Samuel Francis (born 1987), athlete
Iyenemi Furo (born 1978), soccer player
Siminaliaye Fubara (born1979), accountant and technocrat / former Rivers State accountant general

G

Muma Gee (born 1978), singer and actress
Finidi George (born 1971), retired soccer player
Odeni George (born 1995), soccer player
Rose A. George (1946–2010), First Lady of Rivers State
Rufus Ada George (born 1940), Governor of Rivers State
Manuela George-Izunwa (born 1974), politician
Rufus Godwins, lawyer and civil servant
Alabo Graham-Douglas (born 1939), politician
Bikiya Graham-Douglas (born 1983), actress and businesswoman
Damiete Charles Granville (born 1988), model
J. A. Green (1873–1905), photographer
Rosemund Dienye Green-Osahogulu (born 1956), Vice-chancellor of Ignatius Ajuru University of Education

H
Princess Halliday, television personality
Kelsey Harrison (born 1934), Vice-Chancellor of the University of Port Harcourt
Marshal Sokari Harry, politician
Albert Horsfall (born 1941), former security chief

I

Lady IB, singer
Ikuinyi O. Ibani, Speaker of the Rivers State House of Assembly
Christian Ibeagha (born 1990), soccer player
John Ibeh (born 1986), soccer player
Tonye Ibiama (born 1974), businessman
Bernie Ibini-Isei (born 1992), soccer player
David Ibiyeomie (born 1962), televangelist
Osinakachukwu Ideozu (born 1965), estate surveyor, Senator
Catherine Uju Ifejika (born 1959), lawyer
Chinyere Igwe (born 1965), politician
Faith Ikidi (born 1987), soccer player
John Ikuru (1877–1947), King of Ikuru Town, Andoni
Tele Ikuru (born 1966), Deputy Governor of Rivers State
Manasseh Ishiaku (born 1983), soccer player

J

Isobo Jack, nightclub owner
Major Jack, engineer, MHA
Onimim Jacks (born 1961), lawyer
Tamunosisi Gogo Jaja, lawmaker
Nasigba John-Jumbo (born 1988), soccer player
Patience Jonathan (born 1957), First Lady of Nigeria
Oko Jumbo, Chief of Bonny

K
Isaac Kamalu, Commissioner of Finance, Legal Practitioner.
Ignatius Kattey (born 1948), Archbishop, Dean Emeritus, Church of Nigeria.
Kenneth Kobani, Commissioner of Finance, federal minister
Roseline Konya, academic
Fred Kpakol, Chairman of Gokana
Magnus L. Kpakol (born 1934), chief economic adviser to Nigerian president
George T. Kurubo (1934–2000), ambassador to Soviet Union

L
Ndowa N Lale, academic and publisher
Obafemi Lasode (born 1955), actor
Rex Lawson (1935–1971), musician
Sam Ledor (born 1986), soccer player
Lyrikal (born 1983), rapper

M

M-Trill (born 1979), rapper
Davis Mac-Iyalla (born 1972), activist
Chiamaka Madu (born 1996), soccer player
 Prince Eze Madumere (born 1964), Fmr Deputy Governor, Imo State 
Lee Ledogo Maeba (born 1966), politician
Martyns Mannah (born 1975), member of the House of Assembly
Rosemary Marcus, cyclist
Ibiapuye Martyns-Yellowe (born 1945), politician
Maud Meyer, jazz singer
Duncan Wene Mighty (born 1983), musician
Kenneth Minimah (born 1959), Chief of Army Staff
Oliver Mobisson (1943–2010), activist
Barry Mpigi (born 1961), MP, politician

N
Ozo-Mekuri Ndimele (born 1963), academic
Otonti Amadi Nduka (born 1926), dean of education at the University of Port Harcourt
Jerry Needam (born 1966), journalist, newspaper publisher and politician
Martin Newland (born 1961), journalist and executive director
Peter Nieketien (born 1968), former soccer player
Chimaroke Nnamani (born 1960), politician
Ike Nwachukwu (born 1940), politician
Chidi Nwanu (born 1967), soccer player
Olaka Nwogu (born 1965), Senator, civil servant
David Nwolokor (born 1996), soccer player
Chibudom Nwuche, politician
Ogbonna Nwuke (born 1959), journalist
Benji Nzeakor (born 1964), retired soccer player

O

Saint Obi (born 1965), actor
Felix A. Obuah, businessman and politician
Chidi Odiah (born 1983), soccer player
Glory Odiase (born 1993), cyclist
Mary Odili (born 1952), former First Lady of Rivers State, and Justice of the Supreme Court (Retired)
Peter Odili (born 1948), Governor of Rivers State
Walter Ofonagoro (born 1940), scholar, businessman
Clem Ohameze (born 1965), actor
Emmanuel Okah, lawyer
Daisy W. Okocha (born 1951), judge
Agnes Okoh, founder of Christ Holy Church International
Otonyetarie Okoye, civil servant
Olu Benson Lulu-Briggs  (1930-2018), Nigerian statesman and Businessman 
Chinelo Okparanta (born 1981), writer
Aaron Samuel Olanare (born 1994), soccer player
Celestine Omehia (born 1959), Governor of Rivers State
Emeka Onowu (born 1984), political leader
Jimitota Onoyume, journalist
Elkanah Onyeali (1939–2008), soccer player
Daniel Onyekachi (born 1985), soccer player
 Austin Opara (born 1963), member of the House of Representatives
Yvonne Orji (born 1983), actress
Kelechi Osunwa (born 1984), soccer player
Felicity Okpete Ovai (born 1961), engineer
Frank Owhor (born 1958), Attorney General of Rivers State, Federal Commissioner for RMAFC
Ukel Oyaghiri (born 1964), Lawyer, Politician
Richard Daddy Owubokiri (born 1961), retired soccer player
Boma Ozobia, lawyer
Jimitota Onoyume, journalist
Omah Lay, Musician

P

Adawari Pepple, politician
George Oruigbiji Pepple (1849–1888), King of Bonny
Dakuku Peterside (born 1970), lawmaker 
Tonye Princewill (born 1969), businessman and politician

S
Ken Saro-Wiwa (1941–1995), writer and activist
Zina Saro-Wiwa (born 1976), video artist and film-maker
Uche Secondus (born 1955), businessman, political figure
George Thompson Sekibo (born 1957), Nigerian senator from Rivers State
Precious Sekibo (born 1958), doctor and politician
Jesse Sekidika (born 1996), soccer player
Uchechi Sunday (born 1994), soccer player 
Silas Eneyo (born 1956), medical doctor and historian

T
Marco Tagbajumi (born 1988), soccer player
Austin Tam-George, communication and industrial relations specialist
Tekena Tamuno (1932–2015), historian
Cleopatra Tawo, radio personality
Odagme Theophilus (born 1974), medical doctor
Elsie Nwanwuri Thompson, lawyer
Timaya (born 1977), singer
Gabriel Toby, Deputy Governor of Rivers State
Nwankwo Tochukwu (born 1986), soccer player
Hector Tubonemi (born 1988), soccer player

U

Andrew Uchendu, federal lawmaker
Colin Udoh, journalist and sports television presenter
Innocent Umezulike (1953–2018), judge
Mary Uranta, actress and businesswoman
Marshall Stanley Uwom (born 1965), lawyer and businessman

W

Waconzy (born 1983), singer, songwriter
Adewale Wahab (born 1984), soccer player
Obi Wali (1932–1993), activist
Okey Wali (born 1958), president of the Nigerian Bar Association
Taribo West (born 1974), soccer player
Eberechi Wike (born 1972), First Lady of Rivers State
Ezenwo Nyesom Wike (born 1967), Governor of Rivers State
Tasie Wike, lawyer
Kay Williamson (1935–2005), linguist
Jim Wiwa (1904–2005), chief of the Ogoni people
Owens Wiwa (born 1957), medical doctor and human rights activist
Chukwuemeka Woke, chief of staff Rivers State Government. Former Chairman of Emohua

Y
Albert Yobo (born 1979), soccer player
Joseph Yobo (born 1980), soccer player

See also
List of people from Port Harcourt

References

 
Lists of people by state in Nigeria